Whips have managed business and maintained party discipline for Australia's federal political parties in the House of Representatives since Federation. The term has origins in the British parliamentary system.
As the number of members of parliament and amount of business before the House has increased, so too has the number of whips. The three parties represented in the first Parliament each appointed one whip. Each of today's three main parties appoint a chief whip, while the Australian Labor Party and Liberals each have an additional two whips and the Nationals have one additional whip. Until 1994, a party's more senior whip held the title "Whip", while the more junior whip was styled "Deputy Whip". In 1994, those titles became "Chief Whip" and "Whip", respectively.
The current Chief Government Whip in the House of Representatives is Joanne Ryan of the Australian Labor Party, in office since 31 May 2022. The current Chief Opposition Whip in the House of Representatives is Bert van Manen of the Liberal Party.

While many whips have gone on to serve as ministers, only three have gone on to lead their parties: Labor's Frank Tudor, the Country Party's Earle Page, and the National Party's Mark Vaile. Page is the only one of them to have served as prime minister (albeit for only a short time), and Vaile is the only one to have served as deputy prime minister. Tudor, less auspiciously, was the only of them to serve as leader of the opposition.

Page was also one of four people to serve as whip while representing Cowper, the others being Francis Clarke (Protectionist), John Thomson (Commonwealth Liberal and Nationalist), and Gerry Nehl. As of August 2013, one other constituency has the same distinction: Griffith, represented by William Conelan, William Coutts, Don Cameron, and Ben Humphreys—all of them Labor except Cameron. Oddly, the last three served in the seat consecutively.

Australian Labor Party

The position of Government Chief Whip was created on 12 May 1994. The one Deputy Government Whip was replaced by two Government Whips.

Notes

Coalition

Liberal Party of Australia

Notes

Country Party/National Party of Australia

Notes

Defunct parties

Free Trade/Anti-Socialist Party

Protectionist Party

Commonwealth Liberal Party

National Labor

Nationalist Party of Australia

United Australia Party

Lang Labor
New South Wales Premier and Labor Party Leader Jack Lang's adherents in the Federal Parliament crossed the floor in 1931 to defeat Labor Prime Minister James Scullin, precipitating the 1931 election. Following the election, Lang's NSW Labor Party expelled members who, being loyal to the federal party, had stood against official NSW Labor candidates. The federal party then expelled Lang and his supporters. Lang's four supporters formed their own parliamentary party, with Jack Beasley (who had led the faction within the Labor Party) as leader. The party expanded to nine following the 1934 election and at their pre-sessional meeting in October re-elected Beasley and elected a deputy leader and whip. Following Scullin's resignation as Labor leader in late 1935, the Lang and Official Labor began negotiating a resolution to the split, and the two parties formally adopted an agreement under which the NSW Labor Party was absorbed back into the federal party on 25 February 1936.

Notes

References

Lists of Australian politicians
Lists of political office-holders in Australia
Members of the Australian House of Representatives
Opposition of Australia
Parliament of Australia
Political whips